Hamm is a municipality in the district of Altenkirchen, in Rhineland-Palatinate, Germany. It is situated on the river Sieg, approx. 10 km north-east of Altenkirchen, and 40 km east of Bonn.

Hamm is the seat of the Verbandsgemeinde ("collective municipality") Hamm (Sieg). It is the home of the Raiffeisenmuseum honouring Friedrich Wilhelm Raiffeisen who pioneered rural credit unions.

References

External links
Official website

Altenkirchen (district)
Districts of the Rhine Province